Trent Creek is a stream in Barry and McDonald counties the Ozarks of southwest Missouri.

The source of Trent Creek is just to the south of Missouri Route UU northwest of Washburn. It flows to the southwest through the Flag Spring Conservation Area. It passes into McDonald County and under Missouri Route 90 then turns west and flows past Cove paralleling Route 90. About two miles west of Cove it again passes under Route 90 an enters Big Sugar Creek.

Trent Creek has the name of the local Trent family.

See also
List of rivers of Missouri

References

Rivers of Barry County, Missouri
Rivers of McDonald County, Missouri
Rivers of Missouri